The 1985 Commonwealth Heads of Government Meeting was the eighth Meeting of the Heads of Government of the Commonwealth of Nations.  It was held in Nassau, The Bahamas, between 16 October 1985 and 22 October 1985, and was hosted by that country's Prime Minister, Sir Lynden Pindling.

The Nassau Accord was agreed to calling on the government of South Africa to dismantle its apartheid policy, enter into negotiations with the country's black majority and end its occupation of Namibia. The Commonwealth Eminent Persons Group was appointed to investigate the South African issue and report back with recommendations ahead of the special 1986 CHOGM in London.

Once released from prison, Nelson Mandela visited the Bahamas and thanked Sir Lynden Pindling for his role in opposing apartheid. Thabo Mbeki also visited the Bahamas when he became president of South Africa.

External links
The Commonwealth Accord on Southern Africa - Nassau Accord

1985
20th-century diplomatic conferences
1985 conferences
1985 in international relations
1985 in the Bahamas
Bahamas and the Commonwealth of Nations
20th century in Nassau, Bahamas
October 1985 events in North America